Abida cylindrica is a species of air-breathing land snail, a terrestrial pulmonate gastropod mollusc in the family Chondrinidae.

Geographic distribution
Abida cylindrica is restricted to Pyrenees-Orientales in France, and Catalonia in Spain.

Ecology 
Abida bigerrensis lives within crevices or under stones in karstic areas. In humid environments it may also be found on the rock surface.

References

External links
 

Chondrinidae
Gastropods of Europe
Gastropods described in 1829